William Roberts (September 11, 1929 – August 15, 2007) was a halfback in the National Football League. He played with the Green Bay Packers during the 1956 NFL season.

References

External links
 "Former NFL player, 3M manager William J. Roberts; The Edina resident had a colorful career that included a stint in the CIA and more than 30 years in sales at 3M," Minneapolis Star Tribune, August 17, 2007

1929 births
2007 deaths
American football halfbacks
Dartmouth Big Green football players
Green Bay Packers players
Sportspeople from Dubuque, Iowa
Players of American football from Iowa